Banks Pocket is a rural locality in the Gympie Region, Queensland, Australia. In the  Banks Pocket had a population of 156 people.

History 
The locality was officially named and bounded on 1 December 2000.

In the  Banks Pocket had a population of 156 people.

References 

Gympie Region
Localities in Queensland